The Lebanon Lutheran Church  in South Dakota was established by Norwegian immigrants to the Sisseton-Wahpeton (Lake Traverse) Sioux Indian Reservation. It was the first Norwegian Lutheran church in that area predating congregations in nearby Ortley and Summit. It was added to the National Register of Historic Places in 1977.
In the mid-1960s, as rural populations were declining, Lebanon Church became a part of a 3-church merger with Zion Lutheran Church (Ortley) and Summit Lutheran Church resulting in the creation of Hope Lutheran Church in Summit, SD. Regular Sunday services ceased at that point, although the property continues to be maintained and is utilized periodically for special events relating primarily to the history of the church or descendants of the parishioners.

References

Churches in Grant County, South Dakota
Lutheran churches in South Dakota
Norwegian-American culture in South Dakota
Churches on the National Register of Historic Places in South Dakota
National Register of Historic Places in Grant County, South Dakota